The 1905 Philadelphia Athletics season was a season in American baseball. The team finished first in the American League with a record of 92 wins and 56 losses, winning their second pennant. They went on to face the New York Giants in the 1905 World Series, losing 4 games to 1.

The pitching staff featured three future Hall of Famers: Rube Waddell, Eddie Plank, and Chief Bender. Waddell easily won the pitching triple crown in 1905, with 27 wins, 287 strikeouts, and a 1.48 earned run average.

Preseason

1905 Philadelphia City Series

The Athletics played eight games against the Philadelphia Phillies for the local championship in the pre-season city series. The Athletics and Phillies tied in the series, 4 games to 4.

Two games scheduled for April 5, 1905 at the Phillies' Philadelphia Ball Park, and for April 6, 1905 at the Athletics' Columbia Park were called off on account of wet grounds.

The A's all time record against the Phillies was 14–14 through 1905.

Regular season

The A's offense scored the most runs in the league. Slugger Harry Davis led all players in home runs, runs scored, and runs batted in.

Season standings

Record vs. opponents

Birth of the Elephant mascot
After New York Giants' manager John McGraw told reporters that Philadelphia manufacturer Ben Shibe, who owned the controlling interest in the Athletics, had a "white elephant on his hands", manager Connie Mack defiantly adopted the white elephant as the team mascot, and presented McGraw with a stuffed toy elephant at the start of the 1905 World Series. McGraw and Mack had known each other for years, and McGraw accepted it graciously.

Roster

Player stats

Batting

Starters by position 
Note: Pos = Position; G = Games played; AB = At bats; H = Hits; Avg. = Batting average; HR = Home runs; RBI = Runs batted in

Other batters
Note: G = Games played; AB = At bats; H = Hits; Avg. = Batting average; HR = Home runs; RBI = Runs batted in

Pitching

Starting pitchers
Note: G = Games pitched; IP = Innings pitched; W = Wins; L = Losses; ERA = Earned run average; SO = Strikeouts

Other pitchers
Note: G = Games pitched; IP = Innings pitched; W = Wins; L = Losses; ERA = Earned run average; SO = Strikeouts

1905 World Series 

NL New York Giants (4) vs AL Philadelphia Athletics (1)

Awards and honors

American League top five finishers
Andy Coakley
 #4 earned run average (1.84)

Lave Cross
 #2 runs batted in (77)

Harry Davis
 #1 runs batted in (83)
 #1 home runs (8)
 #1 runs scored (93)
 #4 slugging percentage (.422)

Topsy Hartsel
 #1 on-base percentage (.409)
 #4 runs scored (88)
 #4 stolen bases (37)

Danny Hoffman
 #1 in stolen bases (46)

Eddie Plank
 #2 wins (24)
 #2 strikeouts (210)

Rube Waddell
 #1 wins (27)
 #1 earned run average (1.48)
 #1 strikeouts (287)
 #2 shutouts (7)

Notes

References
1905 Philadelphia Athletics team page at Baseball Reference
1905 Philadelphia Athletics team page at www.baseball-almanac.com

Oakland Athletics seasons
Philadelphia Athletics season
American League champion seasons
Philadelphia Athletics